is a Japanese figure skater and coach. He is a ten-time Japanese national champion. He represented Japan at the 1960 Winter Olympics, where he placed 14th, and at the 1964 Winter Olympics, where he placed 8th. His best finish at the World Championships was 4th in 1965.

He is married to Kumiko Okawa, and as of 2011 the couple lives near Yokohama. Their daughter is Yuka Sato, the 1994 World Champion.

Along with Machiko Yamada, he is one of the most successful coaches in Japan.  
His current and former students include 
Miki Ando, Mao Asada,
Shoko Ishikawa,
Hirokazu Kobayashi,
Takahiko Kozuka,
Yukari Nakano, 
Yuka Sato, 
Wun-Chang Shih,
and Fumie Suguri.

In February 2010, he was elected to the World Figure Skating Hall of Fame.

Competitive highlights

References

External links 

 

Figure skaters at the 1960 Winter Olympics
Figure skaters at the 1964 Winter Olympics
Living people
Japanese male single skaters
Olympic figure skaters of Japan
Japanese figure skating coaches
Sportspeople from Osaka
1942 births
Kansai University alumni
Universiade medalists in figure skating
Universiade gold medalists for Japan
Universiade silver medalists for Japan
Competitors at the 1960 Winter Universiade
Competitors at the 1964 Winter Universiade
Competitors at the 1966 Winter Universiade